The Miracle Fighters is a 1982 Hong Kong martial arts fantasy comedy film directed by Yuen Woo-ping and starring Bryan Leung, Yuen Cheung-yan and Yuen Yat-cho. The film's action sequences features various elements of fantasy which includes magic. It was followed by two sequels, Shaolin Drunkard (1983) and Taoism Drunkard (1984) which are similar style films with different storylines.

Plot
During the Qing Dynasty, Han Chinese and Manchu people were not allowed to marry each other. The Emperor commands Ko Hung (Eddy Ko) to kill his wife. However he refuses, and he has to see his wife die and engages in a battle with the Sorcerer Bat (Yuen Shun-yee). To escape, he also takes the infant prince with him. Ko Hung later accidentally kills the prince. However, he then finds an infant under a tree whom he adopts and names him "Shu-kan", which is literally translated as "Tree Root". To cover up what he has done, he puts the prince's jade on Shu-kan. Over a decade later, the Sorcerer Bat tries to kill Ko and tries to kidnap Shu-kan and pass him off as the prince. Ko becomes heavily injured, and Shu-kan (Yuen Yat-cho) goes to find medicine to heal him where he meets two elderly Taoist priests, Kei-moon (Bryan Leung) and Tun-kap (Yuen Cheung-yan). Kei-moon and Tun-kap are disciples of the same master (Yuen Siu-tien), and are always quarreling with each other. There the two teach Shu-kan their martial arts and magic skills. The Sorcerer Bat tries hard to get rid of the two to get Shu-kan, but later he manages to kill Tun-kap. Kei-moon then tells Shu-kan to enter a competition to obtain the Supreme Command. Shu-kan, using the skills he learned, enters the competition where he goes through many different obstacles before he faces off with the Sorcerer Bat. He eventually kills the Sorcerer Bat, wins the competition and brings the supreme command with him. As he returns, he and Kei-moon discover that Tun-kap actually faked his death to fool them to obtain the Supreme Command. The two elders then quarrel again over the Supreme Command. They then decide who will take it in a game of Rock-paper-scissors. First, they both hand gesture "rock", then "paper" but Shu-kan gestures "scissor" and beats them both. With the Supreme Command, Shu-kan commands them to stop quarreling.

Cast

Award nomination
2nd Hong Kong Film Awards
Nominated: Best Action Choreography (Yuen Woo-ping, Brandy Yuen, Yuen Shun-yee, Yuen Cheung-yan, Yuen Yat-cho, Chiu Chung-hing)

External links
 
 The Miracle Fighters at Hong Kong Cinemagic
 

1982 films
1982 action films
1982 martial arts films
1982 fantasy films
1980s fantasy comedy films
Hong Kong action comedy films
Hong Kong martial arts films
Hong Kong martial arts comedy films
Martial arts fantasy films
Kung fu films
1980s Cantonese-language films
Golden Harvest films
Films directed by Yuen Woo-ping
1982 comedy films
1980s Hong Kong films